Bexbach Power Station is a coal-fired power station in the Bexbach municipality of Saarland, Germany. It has an output capacity of 773 megawatts. The chimney of the power station is 240 metres high. It can store up to 200,000 tons of coal.

The first power station in Bexbach, called the St. Barbara, was inaugurated in 1953. It had a capacity of only 100 MW. In 1979 construction of today's facility began. It became operational in 1983.

75% of the power plant is owned by KBV Bexbach Verwaltungsgesellschaft mbH (EnBW Kraftwerke AG 2/3; STEAG Power Saar GmbH 1/3) and 25% is owned by EnBW Kraftwerke AG.

External links

 STEAG page on Bexbach Power Station

Coal-fired power stations in Germany
Buildings and structures in Saarpfalz-Kreis